The Institute of Professional Representatives before the European Patent Office, also known as European Patent Institute (epi), is a professional association of European patent attorneys and an international non-governmental public law corporation. It was founded on 21 October 1977 by the Administrative Council of the European Patent Organisation by adopting the Regulation on the establishment of an institute of professional representatives before the European Patent Office. All European patent attorneys, i.e. all persons entitled to act as professional representatives before the EPO (by virtue of either the European qualifying examination or the provisions of ), are members of the institute. As of 2023, the institute has about 13,800 members across 39 member states.

The European Patent Institute publishes a quarterly journal, the epi Information.

See also 
 Intellectual property organization
 Intellectual Property Regulation Board (IPReg) (UK)

References

External links 
 

Organizations established in 1977
European Patent Organisation
Patent law organizations